I.O.U. Live is a live album by guitarist Allan Holdsworth, released on 15 April 1997 through Cleopatra Records. According to Holdsworth, the tracks were taken from video footage of a 1984 concert in Japan, which later became a bootleg circulating under the name of Tokyo Dream: Allan Holdsworth in Japan. He therefore considered it an unauthorised release and not part of his discography.

Track listing

Personnel
Allan Holdsworth – guitar
 Paul Williams – vocals
Chad Wackerman – drums
Jimmy Johnson – bass

References

Allan Holdsworth albums
1997 live albums
Cleopatra Records live albums